The Oxford Industrial Historic District is a historic district primarily located in Oxford Township in Warren County, New Jersey. It also extends into Mansfield Township and Washington Township. The district was added to the National Register of Historic Places on August 27, 1992 for its significance in community development, industry, and transportation from 1741 to 1930. It includes 385 contributing buildings, three contributing structures, and six contributing sites.

Gallery of contributing properties

References

External links
 

Oxford Township, New Jersey
Mansfield Township, Warren County, New Jersey
Washington Township, Warren County, New Jersey
National Register of Historic Places in Warren County, New Jersey
Historic districts on the National Register of Historic Places in New Jersey
Victorian architecture in New Jersey
New Jersey Register of Historic Places